Pęk is a Polish surname. Notable people include:

 Bogdan Pęk (born 1953), Polish politician
 Karolina Pęk (born 1998), Polish Paralympian
 Marek Pęk (born 1975), Polish politician

See also
 

Polish-language surnames